Veeru Dada  is a 1990 Bollywood film directed by K. R. Reddy and starring Dharmendra, Amrita Singh, Aditya Pancholi and Farah Naaz.

Plot
Widower Chandrakant lives poor lifestyle in India along with his daughter, Rekha, who runs a Yoga Class while he works as a Watchman with Jaidev and his family, which consists of his wife, son, and two brothers, Mahadev and Shahdev. One night Mahadev returns home to find Jaidev and his entire family killed, he informs the Police, who arrest Chandrakant, try him in Court where he is found guilty and sentenced to life in prison. Rekha then meets with wealthy Amit Anand and both fall in love. Amit's dad wants a dowry of 50 Lakhs Rupees, and Rekha is unable to come up with this sum. She comes to the aid of Veeru, who is on the run from the Police, and a grateful Veeru makes her his sister, and agrees to arrange for the dowry. Shortly thereafter, Rekha finds out that her dad has escaped from prison and is in the clutches of Mahadev and Shahdev, who plan to feed him to a man-eating Cheetah. Watch what happens when Rekha finds out that Veeru was the one who handed over her dad to the two vengeful brothers.

Cast
 Dharmendra as Veeru Dada
 Amrita Singh as Meena
 Aditya Pancholi as Amit Anand
 Farah as Rekha
 Shakti Kapoor as Jagraj
 Sadashiv Amrapurkar as Gul Anand
 Kulbhushan Kharbanda as Chandrakant
 Amrit Pal as Mahadev
Anu Kapoor as Hariyali
Gurbachan Singh as Goon

Soundtrack

External links
 

1990 films
1990s Hindi-language films
Films scored by Laxmikant–Pyarelal